Hugo Ralphsmith (born 9 November 2001) is a professional Australian rules footballer who plays for the Richmond Football Club in the Australian Football League (AFL).

Early life and junior football
Ralphsmith was raised in the bayside suburbs of Melbourne and played junior football with the East Brighton Football Club in the South Metro Junior Football League. He attended high school and played school football at Haileybury College.

Ralphsmith earned selection in the local NAB League Boys representative side the Sandringham Dragons as a 16 year old in 2018. The same year, Ralphsmith was chosen to represent the Victorian metropolitan side at a special series of Under 17s exhibition matches against other states, including as one of his side's best players in a win over New South Wales. At the end of the year, Ralphsmith was among 48 players in the country chosen to play in a special Under 17s exhibition match on the MCG ahead of that year's AFL Grand Final.

Ralphsmith joined the AFL Academy's specialised training program ahead of his final year of underage football, after being identified as a potential AFL draftee. He resumed representative football with Sandringham that year and was named a member of the club's official six-player leadership group. Mid-way through the season, Ralphsmith was selected to the squad for the Victorian Metropolitan side at the 2019 AFL Under 18 Championships. He played in each of the series' first three matches, but was omitted from Metro's final match of the series, finishing the tournament with two goals from three matches. Ralphsmith featured in NAB League matches over the second half of the season including being named in the Aussie Rules Draft Central team of the weeks in round 12 and 13. He injured his shoulder soon after and missed six weeks of football as a result. After recovering from that injury, Ralphsmith was among Sandringham's best players in a semi-final win over the Calder Cannons, recording 19 disposals, eight marks and three goals. He added one goal in the club's losing preliminary final against the Oakleigh Chargers.

AFL recruitment
Following the end of the 2019 junior season, Ralphsmith was invited to test athletically at the AFL Draft Combine. There he recorded the equal fifth best results on the two kilometre time trial (6 minutes 12 seconds) and the running vertical jump test (86 cm) of any player that year.

Prior to the draft, Ralphsmith was projected by to be selected at pick 29 by AFL Media, at pick 34 by Aussie Rules Draft Central, at pick 35 by Fox Sports and at pick 42 by ESPN.

He was notable at this time for his speed, endurance and all-round athletic prowess and drew comparisons to  wing Isaac Smith.

Junior statistics

NAB League Boys

|- style="background-color: #EAEAEA"
! scope="row" style="text-align:center" | 2018
|Sandringham Dragons
| 53 || 11 || 4 || — || 75 || 69 || 144 || 28 || 13 || 0.4 || — || 6.8 || 6.3 || 13.1 || 2.5 || 1.2
|-
! scope="row" style="text-align:center" | 2019
|Sandringham Dragons
| 11 || 10 || 10 || — || 97 || 62 || 159 || 38 || 26 || 1.0 || — || 9.7 || 6.2 || 15.9 || 3.8 || 2.6
|-
|- class="sortbottom"
! colspan=3| Career
! 21
! 14
! —
! 172
! 131
! 303
! 66
! 39
! 0.7
! —
! 8.2
! 6.2
! 14.4
! 3.1
! 1.9
|}
Under 18 National Championships

|- style="background-color: #EAEAEA"
! scope="row" style="text-align:center" | 2019
|Vic Metro
| 21 || 3 || 2 || — || 16 || 17 || 33 || 8 || 6 || 0.7 || — || 5.3 || 5.7 || 11.0 || 2.7 || 2.0
|-
|- class="sortbottom"
! colspan=3| Career
! 3
! 2
! —
! 16
! 17
! 33
! 8
! 6
! 0.7
! —
! 5.3
! 5.7
! 11.0
! 2.7
! 2.0
|}

AFL career

2020 season

He began his professional career by playing pre-season VFL practice matches with the club's reserves side in March 2020. By mid-March however, reserves matches were cancelled due to safety concerns as a result of the rapid progression of the COVID-19 pandemic into Australia. Though the AFL season would start on schedule later that month, just one round of matches was played of the reduced 17-round season before the imposition of state border restrictions saw the season suspended for an indefinite hiatus. Ralphsmith returned to the reserves group when the season resumed after an 11-week hiatus, playing an unofficial scratch match against 's reserves due to AFL clubs' withdrawal from the VFL season. After three more scratch matches playing mostly as a half-forward, Ralphsmith moved with the main playing group when the club was relocated to the Gold Coast in response to a virus outbreak in Melbourne. 
Three matches into that stay, Ralphsmith was named as a non-playing AFL-level emergency for the club's round 8's match against . He continued to be overlooked for AFL selection through the remainder of the season and finals series, playing reserves matches while being named as an AFL emergency on one further occasion. Ralphsmith went without making an AFL debut that year, in what was a premiership-winning season for the club.

2021 season
Ralphsmith followed a full 2020/21 off-season training program by being named to play half-back and wing in the senior side during an unofficial pre-season match against  in February 2021. He was unable to secure selection in the club's official pre-season match however, and was restricted to appearances for club's reserves side in the VFL for the entirety of March. Ralphsmith was named an AFL emergency in round 2, but a one-week suspension earned in a VFL match that weekend denied him an opportunity to make an AFL debut in Richmond's injury-hit round 3 side. He sustained an ankle injury in the early minutes of his return match in the VFL in late April, but was able recover in time for the following week's match, before again being named an AFL-level emergency in round 8. Following injuries to Shane Edwards and Shai Bolton the previous week, Ralphsmith was called up to senior level to make his debut in the club's round 9 match against  at Marvel Stadium.

2022 season
Ralphsmith won the Grand Final Sprint on Grand Final Day 2022.

Player profile
Ralphsmith is a versatile player, featuring in various positions over two years with Richmond including as a wing, half-forward and half-back.

Statistics
Updated to the end of round 23, 2022.

|-
| 2020
|
| 45 || 0 || – || – || – || – || – || – || – || – || – || – || – || – || – || –
|-
| 2021
|  || 45 || 6 || 3 || 2 || 27 || 22 || 49 || 7 || 5 || 0.5 || 0.3 || 4.5 || 3.7 || 8.2 || 1.2 || 0.8
|- 
| 2022
|  || 45 || 13 || 5 || 1 || 101 || 87 || 188 || 45 || 17 || 0.4 || 0.1 || 7.8 || 6.7 || 14.5 || 3.5 || 1.3
|- class="sortbottom" 
! colspan=3| Career
! 19
! 8
! 3
! 128
! 109
! 237
! 52
! 22
! 0.4
! 0.2
! 6.7
! 5.7
! 12.5
! 2.7
! 1.2
|}

Personal life

Ralphsmith currently studies a Bachelor of Exercise and Sport Science/Bachelor of Business (Sport Management) at Deakin University.

References

External links

Hugo Ralphsmith's profile at AFL Draft Central

Living people
2001 births
Richmond Football Club players
Sandringham Dragons players
People educated at Haileybury (Melbourne)
Australian rules footballers from Victoria (Australia)